This is a list of people who have captained Western Australia at the first-class, List A and Twenty20 formats of the g. In total, 61 different players have captained Western Australia at some form of the game. Mitchell Marsh is currently the team's captain, with Adam Voges having retired at the end of the 2016/17 season . At Twenty20 level, Western Australia does not currently compete, being replaced by the Perth Scorchers from the 2011–12 season. Statistics are correct as of 12 January 2014:

First-class

List A

Twenty20

References
 CricketArchive: Western Australia Players

See also
List of Western Australia first-class cricketers
List of Western Australia List A cricketers
List of Western Australia Twenty20 cricketers

Western Australia
Western Australia

Western Australia